The 2018 season was Remo's 104th existence. The club participated in the Campeonato Brasileiro Série C, the Campeonato Paraense, the Copa Verde and the Copa do Brasil.

Remo finished outside of the top four of the Campeonato Brasileiro Série C (6th place in the group stage and 13th overall), but they won the Campeonato Paraense by the 45th time. In the Copa Verde, the club was eliminated in the round of 16 by Manaus 3-1 in the aggregate. In the Copa do Brasil, Remo ended in the second round by Internacional.

Players

Squad information
Numbers in parentheses denote appearances as substitute.

Top scorers

Disciplinary record

Kit
Supplier: Topper / Main sponsor:

Transfers

Transfers in

Transfers out

Notes

Competitions

Campeonato Brasileiro Série C

Group stage

Matches

Campeonato Paraense

Group stage

Matches

Final stage

Semi-finals

Finals

Copa Verde

Round of 16

Copa do Brasil

First round

Second round

References

External links
Official Site 
Remo 100% 

2018 season
Clube do Remo seasons
Brazilian football clubs 2018 season